Bernard Cookson (1937 – 26 January 2016) was a British cartoonist and illustrator.

Early life
Bernard Cookson was born in Manchester, England in 1937.

Career
Cookson saw his first cartoon published in 1965, in the Daily Mirror.  Cookson's cartoons were published in many publications including the London Evening News, the Sporting Life, the Daily Express, the Sun, the Mail on Sunday, The Oldie and The Spectator. He was also a regular contributor to Punch.

Cookson said of his work: "One of the most common questions people ask is: 'do you do the captions as well?' Perhaps they imagine that I just draw a picture, in the hope that it will become funny if someone puts a suitably funny caption below".

Bernard Cookson died in January 2016, after a long battle with cancer. He is survived by his wife Franky, and a son in Perth, Australia.

References

External links
Official Bernard Cookson site
British Cartoon Archive Retrieved February 2016

2016 deaths
1937 births
Artists from Manchester
English cartoonists